Aunt Jenny was an advertising character created for Spry Vegetable Shortening. Primarily portrayed by Edith Spencer, Aunt Jenny was best known as host and narrator of the long-lived radio show, Aunt Jenny’s Real Life Stories (January 18, 1937 – November 16, 1956), but she was also seen promoting the product in drawings, photographs and cookbooks.

Origins
In 1936, Lever Brothers, part of the large corporation Unilever, introduced Spry Vegetable Shortening as a competitor to the long-successful shortening Crisco, produced by Procter & Gamble.  Aunt Jenny was  intended to give a pleasant face to what might otherwise be seen as a boring or at least uninspiring product, therefore presenting a challenge to writers of advertisement copy.  Sometimes even Jenny’s enthusiastic writers seemed to be reaching for things to say—on the final page of the Aunt Jenny’s Favorite Recipes cookbook appears a blurb boasting that doughnuts made with Spry are “so light and digestible a child can eat ‘em.”  For the most part, however, Aunt Jenny was successful, and within mere months Spry had consumed nearly half of Crisco’s considerable market share.

In appearance, Aunt Jenny was a slightly plump, grandmotherly woman with bright white hair, thin spectacles, and an ever-present baking apron. Her demeanor was sweet, kind, helpful and enthusiastic, especially regarding her home cooking and Spry Vegetable Shortening in particular. She spoke in a plain and homey manner, often dropping the ending g of words like cooking.

Radio
Aunt Jenny’s best-remembered aspect was the long-running radio show, Aunt Jenny’s Real Life Stories, which made its debut on CBS on January 18, 1937. The show took the format of a dramatic serial or soap opera, presenting a different story weekly, and running for 15 minutes from 10:45am to 11:00am each weekday morning. The stories featured typical soap opera plots involving the people of a small American town called Littleton. Aunt Jenny herself was not the focus of these stories but served as host and narrator. She also offered cooking instruction, generally in the form of easy recipes which included Spry Vegetable Shortening as an ingredient.

Aunt Jenny was played by Edith Spencer, who served not only as the voice of Jenny but also provided her visual appearance in promotional materials. The announcer of the show was actor Dan Seymour. Animal imitator Henry Boyd provided the warbling of Aunt Jenny’s canary. Like most soap operas, the show had a large revolving cast over the years, serving as a springboard into professional acting for future stars, such as Richard Widmark. Eventually, Edith Spencer left the show and was replaced by Agnes Young, who sounded reasonably similar to Spencer but did not look like her. Finally, on September 28, 1956, the show’s long run came to an end.

The Major Broadcasting Network produced an Australian version of Aunt Jenny featuring Ethel Lang in the lead role.

Cookbooks and print advertisements
Aunt Jenny also appeared in numerous print ads found in women's magazines, as well as several promotional cookbooks. These were generally illustrated with photographs of Edith Spencer as Jenny, but after Spencer’s departure from the radio show, they displayed artwork based on her likeness. The character of Aunt Jenny was phased out after the radio show left the air, and Unilever eventually discontinued Spry Vegetable Shortening.

Cookbooks featuring the Aunt Jenny character:
Aunt Jenny’s Favorite Recipes (48 pages with b/w illustrations, plus index)
Aunt Jenny's Old Fashioned Christmas Cookies Cookbook (21 pages, 1952)
Aunt Jenny's 12 Pies Husbands Like Best (21 pages, 1952)
Aunt Jenny's Recipe Cookbook
Aunt Jenny: Home Baking Made Easy
Good Cooking made Easy, Spry the flavor saver (48 pages, 1942; comments by Aunt Jenny throughout)

References

Swell, Barbara – The Lost Art of Pie Making Made Easy, 2004. 
Buxton, Frank – Radio's Golden Age: The Programs and the Personalities, 1966.

Food advertising characters
Female characters in advertising
Mascots introduced in 1936